Koelnmesse station is an at-grade Cologne Stadtbahn station in the district of Deutz, in Cologne, Germany. The station is adjacent to the Cologne Trade Fair.

References

External links 
 Station information 

Cologne KVB stations
Innenstadt, Cologne